Zvonko Lipovac (born 9 October 1964) is a former Croatian association footballer.

Club career
Lipovac played for Borac Banja Luka and Dinamo Zagreb in the Yugoslav First League. While playing for this club, in 1988, he won Yugoslav Cup.

References

External links
 
https://web.archive.org/web/20110728033630/http://www.boracbl.net/intervju/f_lipovaczvonko.html

1964 births
Living people
Association football defenders
Yugoslav footballers
Croatian footballers
FK Borac Banja Luka players
GNK Dinamo Zagreb players
HNK Segesta players
NK Hrvatski Dragovoljac players
NK Inter Zaprešić players
Yugoslav First League players
Croatian Football League players
First Football League (Croatia) players